Anthurium coriaceum  is a species of plant in the genus Anthurium native to southeast Brazil. A "bird's nest" type of Anthurium of the section Pachyneurium, it grows either terrestrially or epilithically in areas of seasonal dryness. It has erect leaves that feel like leather, which is where its scientific name derives from (coriaceous meaning leathery).

References

coriaceum
Flora of Southeast Brazil
Plants described in 1839